Mitton may refer to:

Mitton (surname)
Great Mitton (village and civil parish) and Little Mitton (civil parish), in Lancashire, England
Lower Mitton and Upper Mitton, former hamlets in Worcestershire, now parts of Stourport-on-Severn
4027 Mitton, an asteroid

See also 
Myton (disambiguation)